Vaiki Vanna Vasantham is a 1980 Indian Malayalam film, directed by Balachandra Menon. The film stars Madhu, Srividya, Ambika and Raghuraj in the lead roles. The film has musical score by Shyam.

Cast
 
Madhu 
Srividya 
Ambika 
Raghuraj 
Sukumari 
Sankaradi 
Rajan Sankaradi
Dhanya
Kailasnath
Oduvil Unnikrishnan 
T. P. Madhavan

Soundtrack
The music was composed by Shyam.

References

External links
  
 

1980 films
1980s Malayalam-language films